Delitzsch unterer Bahnhof (lower station) (abbreviated as Delitzsch unt Bf) is one of two railway stations in the town of Delitzsch in the German state of Saxony. It has an average of 2,500 to 5,000 passengers per day.

Location 

The station complex is located in the eastern part of the town. The station building is on Eisenbahnstraße (railway street), with the extended east-west axis of Eilenburger Straße connecting the station to the city centre. The boundary of the station precinct is defined to the north by the station promenade, to the south by Bismarckstraße and to the east by Berliner Straße.

There are commuter parking lots on Eisenbahnstraße where it connects with the federal highway 183a to the north of the station and to the north-west and the south-west of the entrance building. Also located on Eisenbahnstraße is a bus station for regional and city bus lines operated by Auto Webel GmbH and Omnibusverkehr Leupold and a taxi rank.

Northeast of the station is the site of the former Deutsche Reichsbahn Delitzsch coach repair shop, now used a workshop of EuroMaint Rail for the repair of coaches.

History 

The commissioning of the (Berlin–) Bitterfeld–Leipzig railway, including the “lower station”, in 1859 connected Delitzsch with the national railway.

The station area once belonged to the municipality of Grünstraße and was located at the time of its establishment on the outskirts of the city. The municipality and the station were incorporated in Delitzsch in 1862.

The station was destroyed by allied air raids in April 1945. Only the outer walls of the entrance building remained standing. It was reconstructed from 1950 to 1955.

Extensive work was carried out from 1991 to 1993 at the station and on the Bitterfeld–Delitzsch and Delitzsch–Zschortau railways as part of the German Unity Transport Project (Verkehrsprojekt Deutsche Einheit): 8.3  (upgrading of the Berlin–Leipzig/Halle line). Thus the platform next to the entrance building and the island platform and an approximately 40 metre-long pedestrian tunnel were completely rebuilt. The introduction of a new train control system south of Delitzsch from the mid-1990s allows trains to run at 160 km/h between Bitterfeld and Zschortau. With the commissioning of the Leipzig City Tunnel in December 2013, the station was integrated into the new network of S-Bahn Mitteldeutschland.

Transport services 

Delitzsch unterer Bahnhof has rail connections to Leipzig and north to Bitterfeld and Dessau.

The bus station at Delitzsch unterer Bahnhof offers connections to Bad Düben, Leipzig Sachsenpark, Leipzig/Halle Airport and Schkeuditz.

References

Railway stations in Saxony
Railway stations in Germany opened in 1858
unterer